The fifth and final season of the television drama series Winners & Losers premiered on 5 July 2016 on the Seven Network in Australia. In season five, friendship and love will triumph as Jenny, Frances, Sophie and Riley support each other through happiness and heartache, delivering the show's most emotional season yet. Filming for the season began in March 2015 and will wrap in July 2015.

Production 
On 3 December 2014, it was announced that Seven had renewed Winners & Losers for a fifth season, set to air in 2016.

Julie McGauran, the head of Drama at Seven stated, "At its heart, Winners & Losers is about the unbreakable bond of friendship and that's why it resonates with so many Australians. It's an evolving story about young women trying to make their way in life, connected by shared experiences and supporting each other along the way. We're delighted the journey continues."

A fifth season was confirmed on 3 December 2014. A four-month production commenced in Melbourne in March 2015. Production for the season began on 2 March 2015 and concluded on 21 July 2015. Filming for the season began on 16 March 2015, with the first block directed by Fiona Banks.

Cast

Main cast
 Melissa Bergland as Jenny Reynolds
 Virginia Gay as Frances James
 Melanie Vallejo as Sophie Wong
 Demi Harman as Riley Hart
 Sarah Grace as Bridget Fitzpatrick
 Nathin Butler as Luke MacKenzie (12 episodes)
 Nick Russell as Gabe Reynolds
 James Saunders as Pete Reeves
 Scott Smart as Alex MacKenzie (12 episodes)
 Paul Moore as Wes Fitzpatrick (6 episodes)

Recurring cast
 Rachael Maza as Veronica Sewell (5 episodes)
 Nicholas Bell as Keith Maxwell (4 episodes)
 Nick Carrafa as Cliff Boyes (4 episodes)
 Jeremy Stanford as Derek Watters (3 episodes)
 Katrina Milosevic as Eliza Dempsey (3 episodes)
 Frank Sweet as Cain Godfrey (3 episodes)
 Francis Greenslade as Brian Gross (1 episode)
 Denise Scott as Trish Gross (1 episode)
 Jack Pearson as Patrick Gross (1 episode)
 Michala Banas as Tiffany Turner (1 episode)

Guest cast
 Daisy and Lucy Bennett as George James (11 episodes)
 Chloe and Madeleine Taylor as Aalivyah Fitzpatrick (5 episodes)
 Joshua Hine as Dan Fawkner (2 episodes)
 Ian Bliss as Colin Gammell (2 episodes)
 Bob Morley as Ethan Quinn (2 episodes)
 Todd McKenney as Bryce Thomson (1 episode)
 Carolyn Bock as Louise Wong (1 episode)
 Glenda Linscott as Lily Patterson (1 episode)

Casting 
The cast for the fifth season was confirmed in July 2015, when the series was being filmed. Former Home and Away actress, Demi Harman will join the series as Riley Hart. James Saunders will reprise his role of Pete Reeves. Wentworth actress, Katrina Milosevic will join the series as Eliza Dempsey. Katherine Hicks, Tom Wren, Sibylla Budd, and Laura Gordon will not return as Sam Mackenzie, Doug Graham, Carla Hughes and Izzy Hughes.

Episodes

Ratings 

Figures are OzTAM Data for the 5 City Metro areas.
Overnight - Live broadcast and recordings viewed the same night.
Consolidated - Live broadcast and recordings viewed within the following seven days.

DVD release

References

External links 
 

2016 Australian television seasons